Leon Brown "Chu" Berry  (September 13, 1908 – October 30, 1941) was an American jazz tenor saxophonist during the 1930s.

According to music critic Gary Giddins, musicians called him "Chu" either because he chewed on the mouthpiece of his saxophone or because he had a Fu Manchu mustache.

Career
Berry was born in Wheeling, West Virginia. He graduated from Lincoln High School, in Wheeling, then attended West Virginia State College for three years. His sister Ann played piano. Berry became interested in music at an early age, playing alto saxophone, at first with local bands. He was inspired to take up the tenor saxophone after hearing Coleman Hawkins on tour.

Most of Berry's career was spent with swing bands: Sammy Stewart, 1929–1930, with whom he switched to tenor sax,  Benny Carter, 1932–1933, Teddy Hill, 1933–1935,  Fletcher Henderson, 1935–1937, Cab Calloway, his best-known affiliation, from 1937 to 1941. Berry is credited with turning Calloway's band into a legitimate jazz orchestra over the four years of his membership.

Throughout his brief career, Berry was in demand as a sideman for recording sessions under the names of various other jazz artists, including Spike Hughes (1933), Bessie Smith (1933), The Chocolate Dandies (1933), Mildred Bailey (1935–1938), Teddy Wilson (1935–1938), Billie Holiday (1938–1939), Wingy Manone (1938–1939) and Lionel Hampton (1939).

During the period 1934–1939, while saxophone pioneer Hawkins was playing in Europe, Berry was one of several younger tenor saxophonists, such as Budd Johnson, Ben Webster and Lester Young who vied for supremacy on their instrument. Berry's mastery of advanced harmony and his smoothly-flowing solos on uptempo tunes influenced such young innovators as Dizzy Gillespie and Charlie Parker. The latter named his first son Leon in Chu's honor.

Berry was one of the jazz musicians who took part in jam sessions at Minton's Playhouse in New York City, which led to the development of bebop.

"Christopher Columbus", which Berry composed with lyrics by Andy Razaf, was the last important hit recording of the Fletcher Henderson orchestra, recorded in 1936. It is one of the most popular riff tunes from the swing era. It was incorporated into Jimmy Mundy's arrangement of Sing, Sing, Sing for Benny Goodman's band.

Four sessions were organized with Berry as leader, in 1937, 1938, and 1941.

Berry died on October 27, 1941 in Conneaut, Ohio, after being in a car accident.

The Chu Berry saxophone

Chu Berry is the unofficial name  of a series of saxophones produced by the C.G. Conn company during the 1920s, though it is more accurate to refer to them as the Conn New Wonder Series II.

C.G. Conn never used the term "Chu Berry" to refer to any of their saxophones. Berry played a model of tenor sax generally known as the Conn Transitional  and is not known to have ever played a New Wonder Series II.

Some saxophone owners use the term "Chu Berry" in reference to any Conn saxophone made between 1910 and the mid-1930s, including soprano, alto, baritone and C melody saxophones, none of which Berry played.

Discography

As leader
 "Now You're Talking My Language"/"Too Marvelous for Words" (Variety, 1937)
 "Indiana"/"Limehouse Blues" (Variety, 1937)
 "Sittin' in"/"Forty-six West Fifty-two" (Commodore, 1938)
 "Stardust"/"Body and Soul" (Commodore, 1938)
 "Blowing Up a Breeze"/ "Monday at Minton's" (Commodore, 1941)
 "On the Sunny Sides of the Street" / "Gee, Ain't I Good To You" (Commodore, 1941)
 Chu Berry (Commodore, 1959)
 Sittin' In (Mainstream, 1965)

As sideman on compilations
 1992 The Original American Decca Recordings, Count Basie
 1995 The Complete RCA Victor Recordings,  Dizzy Gillespie
 2002 Quintessence : New York-Chicago 1924–1936, Fletcher Henderson
 2003 Quintessence New York-Chicago: 1933–50, Teddy Wilson
 2007 The Complete Lionel Hampton Victor Sessions 1937–1941, Lionel Hampton
 2012 The Billie Holiday Collection: 1935–42, Billie Holiday

References

1908 births
1941 deaths
Musicians from Wheeling, West Virginia
Jazz musicians from West Virginia
African-American jazz musicians
American jazz tenor saxophonists
American male saxophonists
Swing saxophonists
20th-century American saxophonists
20th-century American male musicians
American male jazz musicians
The Cab Calloway Orchestra members
The Chocolate Dandies members
Road incident deaths in Ohio
20th-century African-American musicians